Psylliodes affinis, the potato flea beetle, is a species of flea beetle in the family Chrysomelidae. It is found in Europe and Northern Asia (excluding China) and North America.

References

Further reading

External links

 

Alticini
Articles created by Qbugbot
Beetles described in 1799